Inderjit Singh Bindra, also known as I. S. Bindra, is a cricket administrator who was the president of the Board of Control for Cricket in India (BCCI) from 1993 to 1996.

Life and career
A former Indian Administrative Service (IAS) officer, Bindra, has had an over four-decade long association with cricket administration since 1975.

He was Punjab Cricket Association (PCA) president for nearly three decades. He rose to the role of Special Secretary to the President of India, Giani Zail Singh, in the 1980s.

Mr. Bindra's stellar role in staging the Reliance World Cup in 1987 and opening up the Indian cricket television market is forever lauded by all. India's stature in world cricket improved tremendously when its financial muscle, thanks mainly due to Mr. Bindra's efforts, increased.

Bindra served as the President of Punjab Cricket Association (PCA) from 1978 to 2014. In 2015, he was elected as the Chairman of PCA.

Bindra was elected President of BCCI in 1993 and held the post until 1996. Bindra and Jagmohan Dalmiya were responsible for hosting the Cricket World Cup in the Indian subcontinent in 1987 and 1996. Bindra also worked as principal advisor of the International Cricket Council (ICC) when Sharad Pawar was its president.

In 2015, the PCA Stadium in Mohali was renamed after Bindra as "Punjab Cricket Association IS Bindra Stadium".

He was also an advisor in the formation of the Indian Premier League (IPL) and was later International Cricket Council (ICC)’s Principal Advisor.

References

]

Living people
People from Punjab, India
Indian cricket administrators
Presidents of the Board of Control for Cricket in India
Year of birth missing (living people)